John MacDonald (1860–1947) was a Free Church of Scotland Minister who served as Moderator of the General Assembly in 1915.

Life
He was born in Applecross in 1860, the son of John MacDonald, a seaman, and his wife Mary. He studied at Glasgow University then at the Free Church Training College in Glasgow. He was ordained as a minister of the Free Church of Scotland at Acharacle in 1891. in 1895 he was translated to Raasay. In the Union of 1900 he remained in  the Free Church. He transferred to Rosskeen in April 1908 and remained there for the rest of his life.

In 1915 he succeeded the Rev Finlay MacRae as Moderator of the General Assembly.

He died on 22 April 1947 and is buried in Rosskeen Burial Ground.

Family

In September 1891, in Perth, he married Jane ("Jeannie") MacGregor (1871-1939) from Fortingall. They had several children:

John Norman MacDonald (1895-1984) died in Camden.
Archibald MacDonald (1897-1911) died in his teens.
Alexander (Alastair) Roderick MacDonald (1899-1940) 
Mary Jeanie MacDonald (1902-1921) died in her teens
Catherine MacDonald (b.1904)
Susan Isabella MacDonald (1906-1995) married Rev Donald Mackay.

References

1860 births
1947 deaths
Alumni of the University of Glasgow
19th-century Ministers of the Free Church of Scotland
People from Ross and Cromarty
20th-century Ministers of the Free Church of Scotland